Smokers Delight is the second studio album by Nightmares on Wax. It was released in 1995 on Warp in the United Kingdom, and on Wax Trax in the United States. It peaked at number 84 on the UK Albums Chart.

Critical reception

Smokers Delight was included in Robert Dimery's 1001 Albums You Must Hear Before You Die book in 2005. In 2015, Fact placed it at number 15 on the "50 Best Trip-Hop Albums of All Time" list.

Track listing

Charts

References

External links
 

1995 albums
Nightmares on Wax albums
Warp (record label) albums
Chill-out music albums